is a Japanese surname.

Notable people
 Ami Yamato, Japanese YouTuber
 , a former sumo wrestler from Hawaii
 Hiroshi Yamato (born 1983), professional wrestler
, Japanese footballer
 , a manga author
 , the current top star of Takarazuka Revue
, Japanese screenwriter and director

Fictional characters
 , a police officer character in Detective Conan (Case Closed in English title)
 , a TV character in the anime Mobile Suit Gundam SEED
 , a TV character in the tokusatsu Ultraman 80
 Swordmaster Yamato, a character in Gag Manga Biyori

Surnames
Japanese-language surnames